The Milton Hill Historic District is a historic district in Milton, Massachusetts.  It was listed on the National Register of Historic Places in 1995.

The Milton Hill area first became prominent in the 1740s as the estate of Thomas Hutchinson, a prominent politician whose actions as Acting Governor and Governor of the Province of Massachusetts Bay heightened tensions leading to the American Revolutionary War.  He left the province in 1774, and his estate was eventually confiscated by the state.  It has since then been a fashionable residential area of the town.  It includes the Captain Robert Bennet Forbes House, a National Historic Landmark, as well as the Dr. Amos Holbrook House and Governor Hutchinson's Ha-ha, both separately listed on the National Register of Historic Places.

Governor Thomas Hutchinson's Field, owned by The Trustees of the Reservations, lies in the middle of the district and offers sweeping views of Boston and the South Shore.

Gallery

See also
National Register of Historic Places listings in Milton, Massachusetts

References

Historic districts in Norfolk County, Massachusetts
Milton, Massachusetts
National Register of Historic Places in Milton, Massachusetts
Historic districts on the National Register of Historic Places in Massachusetts